Subvocal recognition (SVR) is the process of taking subvocalization and converting the detected results to a digital output, aural or text-based.

Concept 

A set of electrodes are attached to the skin of the throat and, without opening the mouth or uttering a sound, the words are recognized by a computer.

Subvocal speech recognition deals with electromyograms that are different for each speaker. Therefore, consistency can be thrown off just by the positioning of an electrode. To improve accuracy, researchers in this field are relying on statistical models that get better at pattern-matching the more times a subject "speaks" through the electrodes, but even then there are lapses. At Carnegie Mellon University, researchers found that the same "speaker" with accuracy rates of 94% one day can see that rate drop to 48% a day later; between two different speakers it drops even more.

Relevant applications for this technology where audible speech is impossible: for astronauts, underwater Navy Seals, fighter pilots and emergency workers charging into loud, harsh environments. At Worcester Polytechnic Institute in Massachusetts, research is underway to use subvocal information as a control source for computer music instruments.

Research and patents
With a grant from the U.S. Army, research into synthetic telepathy using subvocalization is taking place at the University of California, Irvine under lead scientist Mike D'Zmura.

NASA's Ames Research Laboratory in Mountain View, California, under the supervision of Charles Jorgensen is conducting subvocalization research.

The Brain Computer Interface R&D program at Wadsworth Center under the New York State Department of Health has confirmed the existing ability to decipher consonants and vowels from imagined speech, which allows for brain-based communication using imagined speech.

US Patents on silent communication technologies include: US Patent 6587729 "Apparatus for audibly communicating speech using the radio frequency hearing effect", US Patent 5159703 "Silent subliminal presentation system", US Patent 6011991 "Communication system and method including brain wave analysis and/or use of brain activity", US Patent 3951134 "Apparatus and method for remotely monitoring and altering brain waves".

In fiction

 In Speaker for the Dead and subsequent novels, author Orson Scott Card described an ear implant, called a "jewel", that allows subvocal communication with computer systems.
 Author Robert J. Sawyer made use of subvocal recognition to allow silent commands to the cybernetic 'companion implants' used by the advanced Neanderthal characters in his Neanderthal Parallax trilogy of science fiction novels.
 In Earth, David Brin depicts this technology and its uses as a normal gear in the near future.
 In Down and Out in the Magic Kingdom, Cory Doctorow has cellphone technology become silent through a cochlear implant and miking the throat to pick up subvocalization.
 William Gibson's Sprawl Trilogy frequently uses sub-vocalization systems in various devices.
 In Kage Baker's Company novels, the immortal cyborgs communicate subvocally.
 In the Hugo Award-winning Hyperion Cantos by Dan Simmons, the characters often use subvocalization to communicate.
 In the Culture novels by Iain M. Banks, more highly advanced species often communicate subvocally through their technology.
 In Deus Ex: Human Revolution (2011), the protagonist is augmented with a subvocalization implant for sending covert communications (and a corresponding cochlear implant for receiving covert communications).
 In the tabletop RPG and video game series Shadowrun, player characters can communicate via subvocal microphones in some instances.
 In Paranoia, all citizens can speak to the computer via their "cerebral cortech" implants.
Alistair Reynolds Revelation Space trilogy frequently uses sub-vocalization systems in various devices.

See also
 Speech recognition
 Silent speech interface
 Throat microphone
 Synthetic telepathy

References

Further reading

External links 
 NASA Ames Center

Computational linguistics
Emerging technologies
Fictional technology
Human communication
Memory
Reading (process)
Speech recognition
Vocal skills